The 1993 famine in Sudan occurred in 1993. It came amidst political unrest and civil war in Sudan.

Aftermath 
In Kongor, the famine killed 20,000 and made 100,000 people leave the region.

The vulture and the little girl 
This famine was the subject of Pulitzer Prize-winning photography "The vulture and the little girl" taken by South African photojournalist Kevin Carter. Carter committed suicide shortly after being awarded the prize, possibly a result of trauma from witnessing the effects of the famine first-hand.

See also
Kevin Carter
Second Sudanese Civil War
1998 Sudan famine
2017 South Sudan famine

Sources
Human Rights Watch:  Civilian Devastation - Abuses by All Parties in the War in Southern Sudan

References

Famine
Sudan 1993
20th-century famines